The National Poo Museum on the Isle of Wight, southern England, is a museum dedicated to the collection, conservation and display of faeces. The museum, which opened on 25 March 2016, is currently mobile but is establishing a permanent location at Sandown Barrack Battery.

Overview
The faeces are displayed in resin spheres, where it can be viewed and held. The process involves drying the poo, which can take up to two weeks, before it is encapsulated and placed in a vacuum chamber, so that air bubbles are removed.  The main aim of the museum is to break down the 'taboo' surrounding poo in human life, and the museum hopes to do this by receiving donations of poo from celebrities. The museum also aims to educate people about the issues related to poo including dog fouling and sanitation.

The museum was founded by members of Eccleston George who are "a collection of creative people who work together on many different kinds of projects", based on the Isle of Wight.

Poo at the Zoo
The first public exhibition, named Poo at the Zoo, opened on 25 March 2016 at the Isle of Wight Zoo, where 20 excrements belonging to different animals were on display. The animals and faeces included:
Lesser Madagascan Tenrec
Tawny Owl
Lion
Meerkat
Cow
Fox
Human baby
38 million-year-old poo
A 140 million-year-old coprolite
A poo with teeth and bones in it
A poo that looks like a cereal bar 
A child's shoe which a cat has marked by pooing in it

The faeces came from animals at the zoo, faeces collected elsewhere and faeces donated by the Dinosaur Isle museum.

Sandown Barrack Battery

Sandown Barrack Battery is a 19th-century fort built on the southwest coast of the Isle of Wight. The National Poo Museum is converting two of the derelict buildings at the battery in order to house exhibits permanently and build a cafe. This is being done with £15,000 from the local authority and a further £2,500 from a crowdfunding campaign.

Reception
The crowdfunding campaign received money from 76 donors over 42 days. The campaign was supported by Kate Humble, the presenter of Curious Creatures - a nature quiz TV series on BBC Two. The series used faeces provided by the museum for a round called 'Whose poo?' where contestants guessed the animal which the faeces belonged to. Humble, a wildlife presenter, said that "The world would be a much poorer place without the National Poo Museum".

Gallery

See also
Shit Museum

References

External links
National Poo Museum Website

2016 establishments in England
Museums established in 2016
Museums on the Isle of Wight
Natural history museums in England
Poo Museum
Feces